Harlow railway station may refer to:

Harlow Town railway station, the main railway station for the town of Harlow
Harlow Mill railway station, Harlow's second (less used) railway station, previously known as Harlow railway station